An Evening with Kevin Smith 2: Evening Harder is the second Kevin Smith Q&A DVD, released on November 28, 2006. The footage is taken from Kevin's Q&As at Roy Thomson Hall in Toronto on November 18, 2004,  and the Criterion Theatre in London on March 7, 2005. A Special Edition 2-disc DVD set released in Australia on October 25, 2006, included An Evening with Kevin Smith since it had not yet been released in Australia.

The subtitle is a reference to Die Hard 2 , as well as a play on the phrase "even harder".

Reception
Eye for Film's review said, "If you're willing to embrace a little geekiness, there are plenty of laughs to be had throughout. Anyone who has seen a Kevin Smith film, or two, and enjoyed them will find Evening 2 time well spent."

References

External links

 Official Trailer - Featuring footage from Toronto appearance.

2006 direct-to-video films
2006 films
Works by Kevin Smith
View Askew Productions films
2006 comedy films